Dyschirius mesopotamicus is a species of ground beetle in the subfamily Scaritinae. It was described by J. Muller in 1922.

References

mesopotamicus
Beetles described in 1922